The 3rd Indiana Cavalry Regiment, also designated the 45th Indiana Infantry Regiment or the 45th Indiana Volunteers was a military unit from the U.S. state of Indiana that participated in the American Civil War. It consisted of two separate "wings" that never operated together:
 The 3rd Indiana Cavalry Regiment (East Wing) (or Right Wing), consisting of Companies A, B, C, D, E and F, organized at Madison, Indiana, August 22, 1861, that were intended for service with the 1st Regiment Indiana Cavalry.  On October 22, the six companies were designated the 3rd Cavalry and assigned to the Army of the Potomac in the Eastern Theater of the war.  The East Wing saw action at the Battle of Antietam and fought with distinction at the Battle of Gettysburg, where in the opening day's action on July 1, 1863 the unit held off far larger Confederate forces until the main Union force arrived. 
 The 3rd Indiana Cavalry Regiment (West Wing) (or Left Wing), consisting of Companies G, H, I, K, L and M.  The first four companies were organized at Madison on October 1, 1861.  In December, they were assigned to the Army of the Ohio.  Company L, organized in October 1862, and Company M, organized in December 1862, later joined the unit in Eastern Tennessee.  The West Wing saw action at the Battle of Chickamauga.  In December 1864, the West Wing companies were transferred to the 8th Regiment Indiana Cavalry.

See also

 List of Indiana Civil War regiments
 Indiana in the Civil War

References

Sources
 Indiana Battle Flags and a Record of Indiana Organizations in the Mexican, Civil and Spanish–American Wars, Indianapolis: Indiana Battle Flag Commission (1929), pp. 589–601.
 Indiana at Antietam: Report of the Indiana Antietam Monument Commission, Indianapolis: Aetna Press (1911), pp. 139–153.

External links
 

3 cav
Military units and formations established in 1861
Excelsior Brigade
1861 establishments in Indiana